The Catalyst is a nightclub located at 1011 Pacific Avenue in Santa Cruz, California. The club has hosted big-name artists such as The Beach Boys, Neil Young, Janis Joplin, Pearl Jam, Tom Petty and the Heartbreakers, Phish, Iggy Pop, and Nirvana. The Catalyst moved to its current location in 1973.

References

External links
 Official website

Nightclubs in California